Mauritius had a life expectancy of 75.17 years in 2014. 39% of Mauritian men smoked in 2014. 13% of men and 23% of women were obese in 2008.

The Human Rights Measurement Initiative finds that Mauritius is fulfilling 72.7% of what it should be fulfilling for the right to health based on its level of income. When looking at the right to health with respect to children, Mauritius achieves 94.1% of what is expected based on its current income. In regards to the right to health amongst the adult population, the country achieves only 85.0% of what is expected based on the nation's level of income.  Mauritius falls into the "very bad" category when evaluating the right to reproductive health because the nation is fulfilling only 39.1% of what the nation is expected to achieve based on the resources (income) it has available.

Healthcare
The Ministry of Health and Wellness is responsible for public healthcare.  Dr Kailesh Jagutpal is the Minister of Health and Wellness as from 12 November 2019. The five regions each have their own Health Advisory Board.  Healthcare, which is financed through general taxation, is free for Mauritian citizens.

Hospitals
There were 166 medical facilities in Mauritius in 2019.   There are 5 five regional hospitals and three  district hospitals

References